USS Andres (DE-45) was an Evarts-class destroyer escort constructed for the United States Navy during World War II. Sent off to the dangerous waters of the North Atlantic Ocean during the Battle of the Atlantic to protect convoys and other ships from Nazi Germany's Kriegsmarine U-boats and fighter aircraft, Andres performed escort and anti-submarine operations.

Andres was originally built as HMS Capel (BDE-45) for the United Kingdom, allocated to the Royal Navy under Lend-Lease. Laid down on 12 February 1942 by the Philadelphia Navy Yard; launched on 24 July 1942; sponsored by Miss Mary Elizabeth Schumacher, the daughter of Captain Theodore L. Schumacher, USN, who was assigned to the Philadelphia Navy Yard; reclassified to DE-45 on 25 January 1943 when the ship was reallocated to the United States Navy; renamed Andres on 4 March 1943; and commissioned at her builders' yard on 15 March 1943.

Service history
After fitting out, undergoing post-commissioning alterations, and completing acceptance trials, Andres proceeded to Bermuda, whence she carried out her shakedown from 12 April to 3 May. Upon completion of this training, she sailed for Philadelphia, Pennsylvania, on 3 May.

While in the course of her homeward voyage, at 1913 on the 4th, she sighted red signal rockets off her port bow. Two minutes later she went to general quarters, changing course toward the direction of the rockets. Soon thereafter, she spotted a dinghy, awash in the sea, containing four men, 1,500 yards off her port bow, and three life rafts lashed together about 1,000 yards beyond. Andres then steered various courses and speeds, picking up men from the water; these proved to be the 31 survivors (28 merchant seamen and three members of the Navy armed guard detachment) of USAT Oneida, which, after straggling from a coastal convoy en route from New York to Guantánamo Bay, had foundered and sunk in bad weather at 0213 on 4 May, some 70 miles northeast of Cape Charles. The men had drifted nine and a half miles since the sinking. Completing the rescue effort at 1950, and ascertaining from the survivors than no additional boats and rafts had gotten clear of Oneida before she had gone down, Andres then resumed her voyage to Philadelphia. She moored at the Navy Yard at 1257 on 5 May, and disembarked the 31 rescued men later the same day.

World War II

North Atlantic
Following post-shakedown repairs and alterations, Andres then conducted further training off Rockland, Maine, and put out of New London, Connecticut, before she proceeded to Miami, Florida, arriving there on 10 June 1943 for duty with the Operational Training Command, Atlantic Fleet. She then operated principally in the Florida Straits area as a school ship at the Submarine Chaser Training School (SCTS), Miami, Florida, indoctrinating student officers and nucleus crews, and interspersed this training with periodic overhauls at the Charleston Navy Yard, South Carolina, (19–29 March, 25 June – 1 July, and 16–26 October 1944).

North Africa
Detached from that duty on 28 November 1944, Andres proceeded to New York, reaching that port on 1 December 1944, and reported for duty with Escort Division (CortDiv) 80 the following day. After refresher training out of Casco Bay, Maine, the destroyer escort then proceeded to Norfolk, Virginia, where she was assigned to Task Force 64. Over the next five months, Andres operated with CortDiv 80 and escorted convoys to Gibraltar and back. Andres returned to the United States on 28 May 1945.

Assignment as a Training Ship
Following upkeep at New York, Andres conducted further training out of Casco Bay before she proceeded back to Miami, Florida, arriving there on 20 July. She resumed work as a training ship, this time with the Naval Training Center, Miami, Florida. Word of the Japanese surrender on 14 August 1945 found the ship operating south of the Dry Tortugas.

Eric Theodore Andres
Andres was renamed after Eric Theodore Andres in 1943. Eric Andres enlisted in the Naval Reserve on 25 October 1941 at Chicago, Illinois and underwent his initial naval training at the Naval Reserve Midshipman's School at Northwestern University.

Ensign Andres was killed on Astoria during the Battle of Savo Island on 9 August 1942.

Post war
Detached from the Naval Training Center, Miami, on 8 September 1945, Andres sailed in company with the other ships of CortDiv 80, and reached the Charleston Naval Shipyard on 9 September 1945 to commence inactivation. Decommissioned there on 18 October 1945, Andres was struck from the Naval Vessel Register on 1 November 1945. She was scrapped in February 1946.

Awards

References

External links
NavSource Online: Destroyer Escort Photo Archive - USS Andres (DE-45)

World War II frigates and destroyer escorts of the United States
Evarts-class destroyer escorts
Ships built in Philadelphia
1942 ships